Massacre Records is an independent record label based in Abstatt, Germany, that specializes in bands of the heavier genres of metal. 

The label was founded in 1991 by Torsten Hartmann. Connected to Massacre Records is the marketing and music wholesale Metal Merchant, the sub-labels Blue Rose Records and Gutter Records for the singer/songwriter genre and for German metal respectively and the music publisher Sylvian Music. Massacre Records also distributes the albums of the gothic metal label MCM Music.

From 1995 to 2000, Massacre Records maintained the sub-label Swanlake Records for its gothic metal and folk metal output. The best-known artists published on Swanlake were Skyclad, Atrocity, Theatre of Tragedy and Liv Kristine.

The best-selling albums released by Massacre are: Velvet Darkness They Fear and Aégis by Theatre of Tragedy and Werk 80 by Atrocity.

Artists

Current 
Atrophy
Coronatus
Crematory
Dark Embrace
Debauchery
Disbelief
Embryonic Autopsy
Eternal Tears of Sorrow
Hatriot
Helstar
Jotnar
Messiah's Kiss
Raunchy
Seelenwalzer
Tears of Martyr
Toxik

Wizard
Viper Solfa

Unsorted

Former 
Dark Millennium
Edenbridge
Mortal Love
Veni Domine

References

External links 
  

German record labels
German independent record labels
Heavy metal record labels
Rock record labels
IFPI members